Montipora flabellata, the blue rice coral, is a species of coral in the family Acroporidae. It is endemic to Hawaii.

Description
Common in shallow water exposed to surge. Usually blue (which may photograph pink), also brown or purple. Colonies are encrusting, with irregular lobes.

Ecology
Like many corals, Montipora flabellata has a mutually beneficial relationship with zooxanthellae, which are photosynthetic algae that live within the coral's tissues.

References

External links

Acroporidae
Cnidarians of the Pacific Ocean
Endemic fauna of Hawaii
Animals described in 1901